Patrice Emery Fongang Feussi (born 3 October 1986) is a Cameroonian former footballer who played as a right winger.

Biography

Genoa
Born in Bafoussam, Cameroon, Feussi started his career at Italian Serie B team Genoa, which he arrived in 2000. He made his Serie B debut on 31 May 2003. He was injured in September and missed nine months.

In July 2004 he was loaned to Serie B team Salernitana along with Antonio Ghomsi. However Feussi failed to play in any games. In June 2005 he was initially loaned to Perugia along with Ghomsi and Maurizio Lanzaro. However, due to Caso Genoa, Genoa relegated to Serie C1 and Feussi remained. He played once for "The Griffin" in September before loaned to Perugia again on 7 September, along with Ghomsi and Rodrigue Boisfer.

Pisa
Feussi was transferred to Serie C1 Pisa in July 2006 on free transfer. He played six times in 2006–07 Serie C1 before loaned to Pizzighettone in January 2007. He followed the team promoted to 2007–08 Serie B and played 33 Serie B games for Pisa.

Sorrento & Lugano
After Pisa bankrupted at the end of 2008–09 Serie B, Feussi was without a club for a few months, and in November signed by Prima Divisione team Sorrento. However, he terminated his contract in January 2010 in order to re-join Genoa. However, he was immediately left for Swiss Challenge League club Lugano (a sister club of Genoa) on 30 January in order to exchange a non-EU registration quota for Danijel Aleksić who was signed from Serbia. Genoa also recalled Steve Pinau from Lugano in order to borrow to French. Feussi played  seasons for the Challenge League club, and released on 30 June 2011.

References

External links
 Swiss Football League Profile 
 Football.it Profile 
 La Gazzetta dello Sport Profile (2007–08) 
 
 
 
 

1984 births
Living people
People from Bafoussam
Cameroonian footballers
Association football fullbacks
Genoa C.F.C. players
U.S. Salernitana 1919 players
A.C. Perugia Calcio players
Pisa S.C. players
A.S. Pizzighettone players
A.S.D. Sorrento players
FC Lugano players
FC UTA Arad players
ASA 2013 Târgu Mureș players
FC Dinamo București players
CS Concordia Chiajna players
Serie B players
Liga I players
Swiss Challenge League players
Cameroonian expatriate footballers
Expatriate footballers in Italy
Expatriate footballers in Switzerland
Expatriate footballers in Romania
Cameroonian expatriate sportspeople in Italy
Cameroonian expatriate sportspeople in Switzerland
Cameroonian expatriate sportspeople in Romania